Spradlin may refer to:

Chris Spradlin (born 1979), American professional wrestler, known under the ring name Chris Hero
Danny Spradlin (born 1959), American football player
G. D. Spradlin (1920–2011), American actor
Jerry Spradlin (born 1967), retired professional baseball player
Kim Spradlin (born 1983), bridal shop owner from San Antonio, Texas, winner of 2012's Survivor: One World
Michael Spradlin, the New York Times Bestselling and Edgar Award-nominated author

See also
Radlin (disambiguation)
Spiradoline